WFTG (1400 AM, "The Wolf") is a radio station  broadcasting a Classic Country format. The station is licensed to London, Kentucky, United States.  The station is currently owned by Forcht Broadcasting, Inc. The station was formerly owned by Elmo Mills. The call letters have informally been interpreted as, "Where Fine Tobacco Grows" due to its location in the tobacco trading district of London.

The station airs CBS News updates at the top of the hour, as well as the complete slate of Cincinnati Reds baseball games.

FM Translator
In addition to the main station on 1400 kHz, WFTG is relayed to an FM translator on 106.9 MHz in order to provide higher quality sound and to also widen the coverage area.

References

External links

FTG
London, Kentucky